The 2016 Malaysia FA Cup was the 27th season of the Malaysia FA Cup, a knockout competition for Malaysia's state football association and clubs. It was sponsored by Kopi Superbest Power (Superbest Power Coffee), and was known as the Superbest Power Piala FA due to sponsorship purposes. LionsXII were the defending champions after beating Kelantan 3–1 in the previous season, but did not compete in this edition.

35 teams entered this years competition. Six teams entered in the first stage with three clubs making the Second Round. The draw for the competition was made on 9 January 2016. The winners were assured a place in the 2017 AFC Cup.

Round and draw dates

Matches 
Key: (1) = Super League; (2) = Premier League; (3) = FAM League

First Round

Second Round

Third Round

Quarter-final 

|-

|}

First leg

Second leg

Semi-final 

|-

|}

First leg

Second leg

Final 

The final was played on 14 May 2016 at Shah Alam Stadium.

Champions

Broadcasting rights 
These matches were covered live on Malaysia television:

References

External links
 Football Malaysia LLP website - Piala FA

 
2016 domestic association football cups
FA